The Hague Tram is a tram network forming part of the public transport system in and around the city of The Hague in South Holland, the Netherlands.

Opened in 1864, as of 2018 the network has twelve tram lines, three of which were built to light rail standards and currently operate under the RandstadRail brand.

Overview 
The first lines in The Hague were horse-drawn. In the first half of the 1880s, steam trams appeared and rapidly replaced the horse-drawn lines, especially in longer services. One of these was the line between The Hague and Delft in July 1887, which is still in service today and extended to Scheveningen Noord. In August 1904, the first electrified line went into service; this is now part of line 9 between Plein and Scheveningen Kurhaus. Most of this line is still part of the line between Vrederust and Scheveningen Noord.

It is used by Lines 2, 3, 4 and 6 and incorporates two underground stations: Spui and Grote Markt. The tunnel is the western section of a grade-separated section of the tram network, part of a proposed semi-metro network in the 1950s. Currently, it includes the tunnel and an elevated viaduct to the east, which includes a branch line for RandstadRail trams that connects to the former Hofpleinlijn near Den Haag Laan van NOI railway station. Trams on RandstadRail lines 3 and 4 use this connecting line. East of Laan van NOI they share tracks and stations with Rotterdam Metro line E trains as far as Leidschendam-Voorburg before diverting onto the former Zoetermeer Stadslijn towards Zoetermeer.

As of 2017, the fleet consists of approximately 250 trams of three types:
GTL8: eight-axle, three-section articulated trams. They have the HTM's red-and-beige livery and are uni-directional with a cab at only one end. These trams were built by La Brugeoise et Nivelles in Bruges, Belgium (actual Bombardier Transportation) in two generations:
GTL8-I, 100 first-generation trams delivered from 1981-1984
GTL8-II, 47 second-generation trams delivered from 1992-1993
Avenio: four-section, 100% low-floor trams. They have the red-and-grey R-net livery and are bi-directional with cabs on both ends. 70 trams (40 trams ordered in 2011, another 20 in 2014 and another 10 in 2017) were built by Siemens Mobility in Germany from 2014 to 2015, and have been gradually replacing the older GTL8 trams since 2015. 
RegioCitadis: three-section, 70% low-floor light rail/tram-train vehicles with dual-voltage capabilities. They have the blue-and-white RandstadRail livery and are also bi-directional. 72 trams were built by Alstom in Salzgitter, Germany, of which 54 entered service in 2006-2007 and a further 18 in 2011. They are used as tram-trains on the line to Zoetermeer and on line 19 between Leidschendam and Delft.

Lines

Line 1

Line 2

Line 3 
 Operated as RandstadRail; tram-train

There are additional services between Den Haag Savornin Lohmanplein and Den Haag Centraal railway station during rush hours

Line 4 

There are additional services between Den Haag Monstersestraat - Zoetermeer Javalaan during rush hours (double units)

Line 6

Line 9

Line 11

Line 12

Line 15

Line 16

Line 17

Line 19 
 Operated with RandstadRail tram-trains or, occasionally, with Avenio urban trams. Plans for extending the route of tram 19 to TU Delft campus exist, but have been postponed due to necessary infrastructure upgrades (rebuilding of the Sebastiaansbridge and problems with electromagnetic interference). Its temporary terminal is located on a third track at Delft railway station.

See also 

 List of town tramway systems in the Netherlands
 HTM Personenvervoer

References

External links 

 
 

Hague
Transport in The Hague
600 V DC railway electrification
750 V DC railway electrification
Hague, The
Regional rail in the Netherlands